Dilday Mill, also known as Finley Mill, was a historic grist mill building located at Greenfield, Dade County, Missouri. It was built in 1867, and was a water-powered, grist mill standing two stories above ground level and three stories above Turnback Creek.  It measured approximately 22 feet by 34 feet. The building collapsed in 1982. 

It was listed on the National Register of Historic Places in 1977 and delisted in 1994.

References

Former National Register of Historic Places in Missouri
Grinding mills on the National Register of Historic Places in Missouri
Industrial buildings completed in 1867
Buildings and structures in Dade County, Missouri
National Register of Historic Places in Dade County, Missouri
1867 establishments in Missouri
1982 disestablishments in Missouri